Duncan Daniels is a US-born Nigerian afropop and afrobeat musician, producer and song writer known for his 2009 single "Like This" featuring M.I.

Early life and education 
Duncan Daniels was born in Boston,  Massachusetts, United States to Nigerian parents.
In his early life, he lived in between England and Nigeria. He had his first degree in Music Production from Berklee College of Music.

Career
Daniels started playing music at the age of 11 and started working on music production at age 15.
In 2006, he released his debut 12-track album " I Don Taya", and in 2010 released his second studio album titled "Sho Stoppah".

He was nominated for "Best US Based Male Artist Of The Year" at the 2011 Nigeria Entertainment Awards, and "Best Diaspora Artist of the Year" at the 2016 Nigeria Entertainment Awards.

Discography

Songs

Albums
 I Don Taya (2006)
 Sho Stoppah (2010)
 Art of Me (2014) 
 More Than a Decade of Music (2016)
 Afro-eclectic (2020) 
 Songs of limitless optimism - S.O.L.O (2022)

Awards and nominations

References

External links 
 

Living people
21st-century American male singers
21st-century American singers
American people of Nigerian descent
1983 births
Berklee College of Music alumni